Harrisburg is a small unincorporated community in Charlotte County, Virginia, United States. Its elevation is 548 feet (167 m).

The Cove was listed on the National Register of Historic Places in 2006.

References

External links

Unincorporated communities in Charlotte County, Virginia
Unincorporated communities in Virginia